Ministry of Social Welfare may refer to:
 Ministry of Social Welfare (Argentina)
 Ministry of Social Welfare (Bangladesh)
 Ministry of Social Welfare (Denmark)
 Ministry of Social Welfare (Malaysia)
 Ministry of Social Welfare and Rehabilitation, Nigeria
 Ministry of Social Welfare, Relief and Resettlement, Myanmar
 Ministry of Social Welfare and Youth (Albania)

See also
 Department of Social Welfare (disambiguation)